Elvan Korkmaz (born 27 July 1985 in Gütersloh) is a German politician of the Social Democratic Party (SPD) who was a member of the Bundestag from the state of North Rhine-Westphalia from 2017 to 2021.

Political career
Korkmaz became a member of the Bundestag in the 2017 German federal election. In parliament, she was a member of the Committee on Transport and Digital Infrastructure and the Digital Agenda Committee.

Korkmaz lost her seat at the 2021 German federal election. In the negotiations to form a so-called traffic light coalition of the SPD, the Green Party and the Free Democrats (FDP) following the 2021 German elections, she was nonetheless part of her party's delegation in the working group on digital innovation and infrastructure, co-chaired by Jens Zimmermann, Malte Spitz and Andreas Pinkwart.

Life after politics
Since 2022, Korkmaz has been working at public affairs agency Gauly in Berlin.

Other activities
 Business Forum of the Social Democratic Party of Germany, Member of the Political Advisory Board (since 2020)
 Federal Network Agency for Electricity, Gas, Telecommunications, Posts and Railway (BNetzA), Alternate Member of the Rail Infrastructure Advisory Council

Personal life
Korkmaz is of ethnic Turkish origin.

References

External links 

  
 Bundestag biography 

1985 births
Living people
Members of the Bundestag for North Rhine-Westphalia
Female members of the Bundestag
21st-century German women politicians
Members of the Bundestag 2017–2021
People from Gütersloh
German politicians of Turkish descent
Members of the Bundestag for the Social Democratic Party of Germany